Avionne Flanagan (born April 6, 1999) is an American professional soccer player who plays as a defender for USL League One side Charlotte Independence.

Career

Youth
Flanagan played with D.C. United's academy until 2016, before spending a year with local club side Baltimore Armour.

College and semi-professional
In 2017, Flanagan attended the University of South Florida to play college soccer. Flanagan went on to make 48 appearances for the Bulls, scoring 4 goals and tallying 7 assists over three seasons. The American Athletic Conference season was cancelled in 2020 due to the COVID-19 pandemic. Flanagan earned First Team All-Conference honors in 2019 and American Athletic Conference All-Academic Team in both 2018 and 2019. 

Whilst at college, Flanagan also played with NPSL side FC Baltimore Christos in 2018. He also played in the USL League Two with Treasure Coast Tritons in 2019.

Professional
On January 21, 2021, Flanagan was selected 29th overall in the 2021 MLS SuperDraft by FC Cincinnati. He officially signed with the Major League Soccer club on April 7, 2021.

On May 21, 2021, Flanagan was loaned to USL Championship side Orange County SC for the 2021 season. He made his first professional appearance the next day, appearing as an 82nd-minute substitute during a 1–0 win over Sacramento Republic.

Flanagan was loaned out again in September, joining FC Tulsa for the remainder of the 2021 USL Championship season.

Following the 2021 season, Cincinnati declined their contract option on Flanagan. On March 11, 2022, it was announced that Flanagan had signed with FC Cincinnati 2, the club's MLS Next Pro side, ahead of their inaugural season.

On August 12, 2022, Flanagan signed with USL Championship side Charleston Battery. One week in to the 2023 season, Flanagan left Charleston to sign with USL League One side Charlotte Independence.

References

1999 births
American soccer players
Association football defenders
FC Cincinnati draft picks
FC Cincinnati players
Living people
National Premier Soccer League players
Orange County SC players
People from Baltimore
Soccer players from Baltimore
South Florida Bulls men's soccer players
Treasure Coast Tritons players
FC Tulsa players
USL League Two players
USL Championship players
FC Cincinnati 2 players
MLS Next Pro players
Charleston Battery players
Charlotte Independence players